The Lausitzer Füchse (literally Lusatian Foxes) is a professional ice hockey team based in Weißwasser, Saxony. They currently play in DEL2, the second level of ice hockey in Germany. Prior to the 2013–14 season they played in the 2nd Bundesliga.

History 
The team was founded already in 1932 but is most significant for its remarkable domination as SG Dynamo Weißwasser in the GDR ice hockey league with over 25 championships. The club was part of the sports association of the East German Ministry of National Defence. After the German reunification the team could not hold its strength, financial problems and relegations followed.

After the 2006/2007 season the team has won the best-of-seven play-down series against Dresdner Eislöwen with 4-2 and remains in the 2nd Bundesliga while the Eislöwen have to play in the Oberliga in the 2007/2008 season.

Since 2008/2009 season in second German league there were six qualifications for the playoffs or pre-playoffs.

Honours 
East German ice hockey champions: (25) - 1951, 1952, 1953, 1954, 1955, 1956, 1957, 1958, 1959, 1960, 1961, 1962, 1963, 1964, 1965, 1969, 1970, 1971, 1972, 1973, 1974, 1975, 1981, 1989, 1990

See also 
 German champions (ice hockey)

References

External links 
 

Ice hockey teams in Germany
SV Dynamo
Ice hockey clubs established in 1932
Deutsche Eishockey Liga teams